Naresh Kaushik is an Indian politician and was a member of the 13th Vidhan Sabha of the Haryana Legislative Assembly representing the Bahadurgarh Vidhan Sabha Constituency, he is a member of the Bharatiya Janata Party.

References 

Bharatiya Janata Party politicians from Haryana
Haryana MLAs 2014–2019